Roscroggan is a hamlet north of Camborne in Cornwall, England.

Fatal WWII plane crash 
In the Second World War, on Friday 24 July 1942, a Bristol Beaufort twin-engine torpedo bomber, AW288, of No. 86 Squadron RAF crashed into the disused Roscroggan Chapel.  
All four of the crew perished at the scene.

References

See also 

 Aviation accidents and incidents

Hamlets in Cornwall